Panda Security is a Spanish cybersecurity software company that specializes in creating products for IT security. Panda Security's core offering is antivirus software and more recently has expanded into providing and developing cybersecurity software. This includes security products and services for both businesses and home users, as well as protection tools for systems, networks, emails, and other private information. Panda Security employs around 450 people.

Overview
In 2005, Panda Security was the fourth largest antivirus vendor worldwide, with 3.2% of the marketplace. In November 2015 OPSWAT measured Panda Security's market share to be 3.6%. The company, whose shares were previously 100% held by Mikel Urizarbarrena, announced on 24 April 2007, the sale of 75% of its shares to Southern European investment group Investindustrial and private equity firm Gala Capital. On 30 July 2007 the company changed its name from Panda Software to Panda Security and Urizarbarrena was replaced by Jorge Dinares. Almost one year later, on 3 June 2008, amidst flagging sales, the board of directors voted to replace Dinares with Juan Santana, the CEO. Santana resigned in September 2011 and was replaced by José Sancho as acting CEO.

Panda Security is rated in Jan 2018 by Gartner analysts as an Endpoint Protection Visionary. Technological milestones include its launch of security systems, such as the SaaS concept (Security as a Service) or antivirus solutions that provide protection from the cloud (cloud computing) and are based on what Panda calls Collective Intelligence, a security model Panda introduced on the market in 2007. According to its CEO, the main benefit this security model provides is that it allows automatic scanning of threats instead of the manual scans carried out by other companies.

The firm has subsidiaries in the US, Italy, Switzerland, Germany, Austria, Belgium, the Netherlands, France, UK, Sweden, Finland, Spain, and Japan. Additionally, it has franchises in another 44 countries. The US subsidiary moved its headquarters to Orlando, Florida in 2009.

In late 2009, Panda Security created a partnership with Web of Trust to help fight against the war of viruses.

Panda was previously embroiled in a lawsuit with one of its channel partners, External Technologies, Inc.  In 2013, Panda prevailed in its lawsuit against External Technologies, recovering a judgment in excess of $100,000 and prevailing on all claims asserted by External against Panda. On 3 August 2010, a new office location in Menlo Park, California was publicly announced by Panda's CEO via his Twitter account.

In 2012, the firm was the tenth largest antivirus vendor worldwide, with 2.0% of the marketplace.

In March 2020, Seattle-based network security firm WatchGuard announced that they entered into an agreement to acquire Panda Security.

Products 

TruPrevent, which was introduced in 2003, is the firm's technologies for proactive protection, as opposed to traditional antivirus products, which provide reactive protection. It offers generic protection against many of the techniques used by new malware, with policies and rules that are developed based on the new vulnerabilities that appear daily. Collective Intelligence" is the firm's protection system to automatically detect, scan and classify malware in real time, introduced in 2007

This technology is implemented in its 2009 and 2010 antivirus products for home users and in Panda Cloud Antivirus, which the company has classified as the first antivirus in history that provides protection from the cloud

Ratings 
In 2015, Panda Security obtained the best rate protection in the Real World Protection Test by AV-Comparatives. In 2018, Panda antivirus received their Gold award by [AV-Comparatives]. for the Whole Product Dynamic "Real-World" Protection Test.

Panda Security was named Company of the Year 2016 by leading Spanish newspaper el Suplemento for innovative work, growth outreach and history. Panda Adaptive Defense is the first Endpoint Detection and Response (EDR) security solution to achieve the EAL2+ security certification under the Common Criteria standard, published in the BOE (Official State Bulletin) for May 2018. It was listed as a "Qualified IT Security Product" by the Spanish National Cryptologic Center in May 2018.

In 2016 it was named best Advanced Persistent Threat (APT) Solution by Computing Magazines Security Excellence Awards. In 2018 it was recognised as the PC Pro A-List Security product for the second year running, and received an IT Pro Editor's Choice Award calling it "smarter than your average protection solution"

See also 

 Antivirus software
 Comparison of antivirus software
 Comparison of computer viruses
 Internet security
 Panda Cloud Antivirus

References

External links
 

Computer security software companies
Software companies of Spain
Basque companies
Antivirus software
Windows security software
Spanish brands
Spanish companies established in 1990